Akama may refer to:
 Akama, a historical district in Munakata, Fukuoka, Japan
 Akama Shrine, a Shinto shrine in Shimonoseki, Yamaguchi Prefecture, Japan
 Akama Station, a train station in Munakata, Fukuoka, Japan
 Akamas (Turkish: Akama), a promontory in northwest Cyprus
 Denkichi Akama, a character in the Akira Kurosawa film The Idiot
 Jiro Akama, a Japanese politician